"Goodnight and Go" is a song by British singer-songwriter Imogen Heap, the second single from her 2005 album Speak for Yourself. The single received a little more push and promotion in the US than "Hide and Seek", and the music video received airplay on VH1. Jeff Beck plays guitar on the track.

Release
"Goodnight and Go" was remixed by Heap for radio to include elements from her live performances of the track and labelled as 'Immi's Radio Mix', which is accompanied on the release by a brand new track "Speeding Cars".

The video, which is featured on the CD release, hit MTV and VH1 UK in early April, before being added to other television channels later in the month, and the single charted at number 56 in the official UK top 75 singles chart. A special edit of the video for the US market was released in late April.

New Mac OS X Leopard Demos introduced on 11 June 2007 feature "Goodnight and Go".

The song was featured on the second series of Made in Chelsea which aired on 14 November 2011.

As of 2009 the song had sold 159,000 copies in United States.

Track listings
CD single and 7" vinyl
 "Goodnight and Go" (Immi's Radio Mix) – 3:26
 "Speeding Cars" – 3:31

Promo CD
 "Goodnight and Go" (Immi's Radio Mix) – 3:26
 "Goodnight and Go" (album version) – 3:52

Charts

Ariana Grande version

American singer Ariana Grande covered/remixed the song for her fourth studio album Sweetener, released in August 2018. Grande's version uses a sample of the original as part of an original arrangement but with extra harmonies and different song structures, with a new verse penned by Grande. It was written by Grande and Victoria Monét along with its producers Tommy Brown, Charles Anderson and Michael Foster. In terms of music "Goodnight n Go" is an EDM and future bass song that contains trap and deep house elements.

Background and release
Tommy Brown, Charles Anderson and Michael Foster handled the production of the song. It was recorded at Glenwood Place Burbank, California, with Jeremy Lertola providing recording engineer assistance. Serban Ghenea mixed the track, and John Hanes as the assistant mixer. Grande's version uses a sample of the original as part of an original arrangement, reharmonizing and rearranging the song's structure. The chorus and bridge lyrics of the original are retained, with a new verse penned by Grande.

Composition
"Goodnight n Go" is an EDM and future bass song, with tropical and deep house elements. It runs for a total duration off three minutes and nine seconds. According to the sheet music published at Musicnotes.com by Universal Music Publishing Group, the song is composed in the key of C#Major with a tempo of 111 beats per minute. Grande's vocals range from the note of F♯3 to Gb5.

Reaction
Heap responded positively to the cover/remix, calling it "a gift" and that she "love[d] that saucy verse she’s put in there and twisted it up at the end. What’s not to like?"

Live performances

The song was debuted live by Grande on The Sweetener Sessions. It was later performed on the Sweetener World Tour on all dates from March 18 to May 11, 2019 before being replaced by "Get Well Soon". The song was also performed during the first night of Grande's performance at Coachella Valley Music and Arts Festival on April 14, 2019.

Charts

Certifications

References

2006 songs
British songs
Dance-pop songs
Imogen Heap songs
Songs written by Imogen Heap
Goodnight n Go
2018 songs
Songs written by Ariana Grande
Songs written by Victoria Monét
Songs written by Charles Anderson
Songs written by Tommy Brown (record producer)
Song recordings produced by Tommy Brown (record producer)
Song recordings produced by Charles Anderson
Song recordings produced by Imogen Heap